This is a list of people killed in duels by date:

16th century 

Cadeguala, Mapuche toqui, by Alonso García de Ramón at Purén, Chile 1585
Sir William Drury, English politician and soldier, by Sir John Borough, died from wound received in duel in France 1590
Gabriel Spenser, Elizabethan actor, by Ben Jonson on Hoxton Fields, London 1598

17th century 

Sir John Townshend, English politician, by Sir Matthew Browne on Hounslow Heath, London 1603. Browne himself was killed on the spot by Townshend, who in turn died of his wounds the following day.
Peter Legh, English politician, by Valentine Browne 1640
Armand d'Athos, inspiration for the Alexandre Dumas character of the same name 1643
Charles Price, English politician, by Capt. Robert Sandys at Presteigne 1645
Sir Henry Bellasis (heir of John Belasyse, 1st Baron Belasyse), by Thomas Porter (dramatist) at Covent Garden, London 1667
Francis Talbot, 11th Earl of Shrewsbury, by the Duke of Buckingham 1668
Walter Norborne, English politician, by an Irishman at the fountain at Middle Temple, London 1684
John Talbot, brother of the Earl of Shrewsbury, by Henry Fitzroy, 1st Duke of Grafton 1686
Sir Henry Hobart, English politician, by Oliver Le Neve on Cawston Heath, Norfolk 1698

18th century 

Sir John Hanmer, 3rd Baronet, English politician 1701
Charles Mohun, 4th Baron Mohun, perennial duellist and James Hamilton, 4th Duke of Hamilton, in Hyde Park, London. The Hamilton–Mohun Duel 1712
Peder Tordenskjold, Norwegian naval officer, by Jakob Axel Staël von Holstein 1720
George Lockhart, Scottish politician and writer, Jacobite spy 1731
Richard Nugent, Lord Delvin, by Capt. George Reilly at Marlborough Bowling Green, Dublin 1761
Button Gwinnett, signer of the Declaration of Independence by Lachlan McIntosh near Savannah, Georgia 1777
Sir Barry Denny, 2nd Baronet 1794

19th century 
Philip Hamilton, son of former U.S. Secretary of the Treasury, Alexander Hamilton, by George I. Eacker, in Weehawken, New Jersey 1801
Richard Dobbs Spaight, delegate to the Continental Congress and Governor of North Carolina, by John Stanly 1802
Peter Lawrence Van Allen, lawyer, by William Harris Crawford, future U.S. Secretary of the Treasury, at Fort Charlotte in South Carolina 1802
Alexander Hamilton, former U.S. Secretary of the Treasury, by U.S. Vice President Aaron Burr, in Weehawken, New Jersey 1804
Thomas Pitt, 2nd Baron Camelford, English peer and naval officer, by his friend Thomas Best near Holland House, London 1804
Charles Dickinson, by future U.S. President Andrew Jackson 1806
Robert Case, naval officer, by naval surgeon William Bland at Cross Island, Bombay – 1813
Charles Lucas, legislator in Missouri Territory, by U.S. Senator Thomas Hart Benton 1817
Armistead Thomson Mason, U.S. Senator from Virginia 1819
Stephen Decatur, American naval hero, by James Barron 1820
John Scott, founder and editor of the London Magazine 1821
Joshua Barton, first Missouri Secretary of State 1823
Henry Wharton Conway, Arkansas politician 1827
Évariste Galois, mathematician 1832
Robert Lyon, last Canadian duelling fatality 1833
Aleksandr Pushkin, Russian poet and writer of the Romantic era, by Georges d'Anthès 1837
Jonathan Cilley, U.S. Representative from Maine, by William J. Graves 1838
Mikhail Lermontov, Russian poet and writer of the Romantic era 1841
George A. Waggaman, U.S. Senator from Louisiana 1843
James Alexander Seton, the last British person to die in a duel in the United Kingdom  1845
John Hampden Pleasants, American newspaper editor 1846
Edward Gilbert, U.S. newspaper editor, by James W. Denver near Sacramento 1852
Frédéric Constant Cournet, French revolutionary. Killed by Frenchman, Emmanuel Barthélemy in the last duel in the United Kingdom 1852
David C. Broderick, U.S. Senator from California 1859
Lucius M. Walker, Confederate Civil War general 1863
Ferdinand Lassalle, German socialist leader 1864
Manuel Corchado y Juarbe, Puerto Rican poet, journalist and politician 1884
Felice Cavallotti, Italian radical leader 1898

References

See also
Lists of people by cause of death
List of famous duels